Grigore Alexandrescu (22 February 1810, Târgovişte – 25 November 1885 in Bucharest) was a nineteenth-century Romanian poet and translator noted for his fables with political undertones.

He founded a periodical, Albina Româneascǎ. Alexandrescu wrote Poezii (1832, 1838, 1839) and Meditaţii (1863), many of which were fables and satires influenced by French literature.

Works (summary) 
 Poezii (1832) 
 Fabule (1832)
 Meditații (1835)
 Poezii (1838)
 Fabule (1838)
 Poezii (1839)
 Memorial (1842)
 Poezii (1842)
 Suvenire și impresii, epistole și fabule (1847)
 Meditații, elegii, epistole, satire și fabule (1863)

References

External links

 
 

Romanian male poets
Romanian fabulists
People from Târgoviște
Burials at Bellu Cemetery
1810 births
1885 deaths
19th-century Romanian poets
19th-century male writers